Nathan is a suburb in the City of Brisbane, Queensland, Australia.

Geography
Nathan is home to Toohey Forest Conservation Park, Griffith University's Nathan campus and the Queensland Sport and Athletics Centre which hosted the opening ceremony of the 1982 Commonwealth Games. The Queensland Academy of Sport currently uses the facilities located at the stadium. The Mount Gravatt Cemetery is part of Nathan.

Nathan remains sparsely populated, with much of the park and university campus being filled with eucalypt forest, grass trees, banksia and leptospermum. Local fauna include tawny frogmouths, powerful owl, hoary wattled bats, sugar gliders, greater gliders, squirrel gliders, flying foxes and possums.

Surrounding suburbs include MacGregor, Robertson, Salisbury, Coopers Plains, Tarragindi, Holland Park and Upper Mount Gravatt.

The Mount Gravatt Cemetery and Crematorium is located in the suburb along Mains Road.

History

The Mount Gravatt cemetery opened in 1918.

The suburb was named on 1 August 1967 after Sir Matthew Nathan, Governor of Queensland from 1920 to 1926.

In the 2011 census the population of Nathan was 1,397, 48.4% female and 51.6% male. The median age of the Nathan population was 24 years of age, 13 years below the Australian median. Almost half of the population (41.4%) were aged in the range 15–24, compared to the national average of 13.3% in this range. 65.3% of people living in Nathan were born in Australia, compared to the national average of 69.8%. The other top responses for country of birth were New Zealand 3.6%, China 3.4%, England 2.9%, India 2.2%, Germany 1.1%. 75.6% of people spoke only English at home; the next most popular languages were 3.2% Mandarin, 1.5% Cantonese, 1.2% Vietnamese, 0.9% Indonesian, 0.8% Hindi. The most popular religious affiliation was "no religion" (32%), followed by Catholic (21%) and Anglican (13%). It is a culturally diverse suburb, with over 30% more overseas-born residents (27.57%) than the Brisbane average (21.03%). Although populated by local Aborigines until the 1940s, less than 1% of residents are indigenous Australians today.

Education 
Toohey Forest Environmental Education Centre is an Outdoor and Environmental Education Centre at South Ring Road.

See also

 List of Brisbane suburbs

References

External links
 

Suburbs of the City of Brisbane
Populated places established in 1967
1967 establishments in Australia